Clermont, New Jersey may refer to:

Clermont, Burlington County, New Jersey
Clermont, Cape May County, New Jersey